Clathrolucina costata, or the costate lucine, is a species of bivalve mollusc in the family Lucinidae. It can be found along the Atlantic coast of North America, ranging from North Carolina to the West Indies.

References

Lucinidae
Molluscs of the Atlantic Ocean
Bivalves described in 1842
Taxa named by Alcide d'Orbigny